The 2001–02 season was the 101st season in Athletic Bilbao's history and their 71st consecutive season in La Liga, the top division of Spanish football.

Season summary

Ahead of the season, head coach Txetxu Rojo departed after only one season in charge, returning to his previous post at Real Zaragoza. In his place, Athletic hired German Jupp Heynckes, who had been out of work since leaving Portuguese club Benfica the previous September. Heynckes was returning to San Mamés, having previously coached the club between 1992 and 1994, and he had had considerable success in the meantime, winning the UEFA Champions League with Real Madrid in 1998.

Heynckes was able to guide the Bilbao side back into the La Liga top ten, securing a ninth-place finish. They enjoyed a successful run in the Copa del Rey, reaching the semifinals before being defeated by eventual runners-up Real Madrid. This marked their best cup run since reaching the same stage in 1986–87.

Squad statistics

Appearances and goals

|}

Results

La Liga

League table

See also
2001–02 La Liga
2001–02 Copa del Rey

External links

References

Athletic Bilbao
Athletic Bilbao seasons